Colliver is a surname. Notable people with the surname include:

 Barry Colliver (born 1935), Australian rules footballer 
 Horace Stanley Colliver (1874–1957), Canadian businessman and politician

See also
 Collier (surname)